was the twenty-ninth of the fifty-three stations (shukuba) of the Tōkaidō. It is located in what is now Hamamatsu's Naka-ku in Shizuoka Prefecture, Japan.

History
During the Tenpō era (1830–1844), Hamamatsu-juku was located in Hamamatsu Castle's castle town. At the time, there were six honjin and 94 hatago for travelers to use, making it the largest post station in Tōtōmi and Suruga provinces. At the time, it was located on the right bank of the Tenryū River, but, over time, the river's course changed, so the post station is now approximately six kilometers from the river's edge.

The classic ukiyo-e print by Andō Hiroshige (Hōeidō edition) from 1831–1834 depicts a rural scene with Hamamatsu Castle and the town in the far distance. A group of peasants are warming themselves by a bonfire, with a traveler looking on.

Neighboring post towns
Tōkaidō
Mitsuke-juku - Hamamatsu-juku - Maisaka-juku

Further reading
Carey, Patrick. Rediscovering the Old Tokaido:In the Footsteps of Hiroshige. Global Books UK (2000). 
Chiba, Reiko. Hiroshige's Tokaido in Prints and Poetry. Tuttle. (1982) 
Taganau, Jilly. The Tokaido Road: Travelling and Representation in Edo and Meiji Japan. RoutledgeCurzon (2004).

References

Stations of the Tōkaidō
Hamamatsu
Stations of the Tōkaidō in Shizuoka Prefecture